Rosegie Amis Ramos (born 15 December 2003) is a Filipino weightlifter, competing in the women's 49 kg category.

Career
Ramos first participated at the 2019 Asian Youth & Junior Weightlifting Championships competing in the women's youth 49 kg category. She placed fourth overall.

She then participated at the 2021 Southeast Asian Games, her first senior competition while still being a youth lifter. She received a bronze medal and achieved three national records in the process. In the same year, she participated at the 2022 Asian Youth & Junior Weightlifting Championships. Now competing as a junior, she won the gold medal in the junior women's 49 kg category.

Personal life
Ramos's sister Rose Jean Ramos is also a weightlifter.

Major results

References

2003 births
Living people
21st-century Filipino women
Filipino sportspeople
Filipino female weightlifters
People from Zamboanga City
Sportspeople from Zamboanga City
Competitors at the 2021 Southeast Asian Games
Southeast Asian Games bronze medalists for the Philippines
Southeast Asian Games medalists in weightlifting